Bradyrhizobium guangdongense is a bacterium from the genus of Bradyrhizobium which has been isolated from the effective nodules of a peanut plant (Arachis hypogaea).

References

Nitrobacteraceae
Bacteria described in 2015